"Fustercluck" is the fourth episode of the American crime comedy-drama television series Terriers. The episode was written by Jon Worley, and directed by Michael Offer. It was first broadcast on FX in the United States on September 29, 2010.

The series is set in Ocean Beach, San Diego and focuses on ex-cop and recovering alcoholic Hank Dolworth (Donal Logue) and his best friend, former criminal Britt Pollack (Michael Raymond-James), who both decide to open an unlicensed private investigation business. In the episode, Hank and Britt accept Robert Lindus' help in stealing bearer bonds from his office for payment, as well as knowing who killed Mickey.

According to Nielsen Media Research, the episode was seen by an estimated 0.649 million household viewers and gained a 0.3/1 ratings share among adults aged 18–49. The episode received critical acclaim, with critics praising the writing, acting, tension, humor, and climax.

Plot
Hank (Donal Logue) and Britt (Michael Raymond-James) are approached by Josephine (Jackie Debatin), the wife of Robert Lindus (Christopher Cousins), telling them they must meet with her husband in prison. Visiting him, Lindus claims that he wasn't involved in Mickey's death and expresses fear that his family may be in danger from his colleagues. He tells Hank and Britt that they need to steal $250,000 from themselves.

Despite Britt's reservations, Hank accepts to help them. Josephine tells them that they have to steal bearer bonds which he has hidden in his now-sealed office, with a high level of security. She promises them a payment of $100,000, as well as the person responsible for Mickey's death. Meanwhile, Hank starts noticing more noises around the house and eventually catches the person who hid in his attic: his schizophrenic sister Stephanie (Karina Logue), who has been living there for four weeks after escaping from various psychiatric hospitals.

Leaving Steph in the care of Katie (Laura Allen), Hank and Britt reach Lindus' office. Britt sneaks in and knocks the office's alarm, prompting the bigger alarm to turn on and the police are called to the scene. Britt leaves before the police arrive, deeming the scene as a failed robbery attempt. They call a reparations service, which has been replaced with Hank's number. Hank shows up, and replaces the pad with a new one. Claiming that he needs the room closed, he seizes the opportunity to steal the bonds and a key from the office's vault.

The next day, they give the bonds and key to Josephine, while they receive money and the name of the drug dealer that killed Mickey: William (Channon Roe). Hank confronts William at his house, who states that he was forced by a person to inject Mickey, who was already intoxicated. Hank then hurries with Britt to catch the Lindus family, who used the bonds to pay for Lindus' bail. They arrive in time just as they intend to board a plane. They take Lindus, forcing him to reveal who forced Mickey to use the drugs. They use the key to open a safe deposit box, which contains an envelope. Lindus attempts to flee but is hit by a car, wounding him.

As they can't go to the hospital, they take him to Hank's house. Before Lindus can say anything, he dies from his wounds. To complicate matters, Mark (Rockmond Dunbar) visits the house, as Josephine informed him that Hank and Britt took her husband. They manage to fool him into not finding anything and he leaves, but he asks them to come with them. After Mark, Hank, and Britt leave the house, Steph goes to the bathroom, staring at a dead Lindus in the bathtub.

Reception

Viewers
The episode was watched by 0.649 million viewers, earning a 0.3/1 in the 18-49 rating demographics on the Nielson ratings scale. This means that 0.3 percent of all households with televisions watched the episode, while 1 percent of all households watching television at that time watched it. This was a 14% increase in viewership from the previous episode, which was watched by 0.568 million viewers with a 0.2/1 in the 18-49 rating demographics.

Critical reviews
"Fustercluck" received critical acclaim. Noel Murray of The A.V. Club gave the episode an "A" grade and wrote, "And like its top cable contemporaries, Terriers grounds its crazy plot twists in the strengths, flaws and moral codes of its characters. In 'Fustercluck', for example, just about every move Hank makes in the episode can be traced back to that pathetic box containing Mickey's entire life."

Alan Sepinwall of HitFix wrote, "'Fustercluck' felt like the strongest Terriers episode yet. After two weeks of self-contained cases mixed with ongoing personal stories, we're hip-deep in Lindus shenanigans again, and I think the balance has been good for the show. It's important to see the guys' work not always revolve around this big case, but at the same time the stakes do get higher in this situation, the tension is greater, and at times the laughs are bigger." Matt Richenthal of TV Fanatic gave the episode a 4.2 star rating out of 5 and wrote, "I have to applaud the writers for going at such a perfect pace over the first four episodes. After laying the groundwork for the Hank and Britt friendship, Terriers grew a bit darker last week, and then really upped the ante on this installment."

References

External links
 

2010 American television episodes
Terriers episodes